In the 2011–12 football season, the top league, Uruguayan Primera División, was won by Nacional. Progreso won the Segunda División and won promotion along with Central Español and Juventud. Three Uruguayan teams qualified for each of the 2011 Copa Sudamericana and 2012 Copa Libertadores. The national team played the first five of its qualifying matches for the 2014 FIFA World Cup, and took part in the 2011 Pan American Games, where the team lost to Argentina in the semifinal. National youth teams (U-20, U-17 and U-15) were also in action.

National leagues

Uruguayan Primera División

Apertura champion: Nacional (10th title)
Top scorer: Marcelo Zalayeta (8 goals)
Clausura champion: Defensor Sporting (3rd title)
Top scorer: Richard Porta (14 goals)
Overall champion: Nacional (44th title)
Top scorer: Richard Porta (17 goals)
International qualifiers:
Copa Libertadores:
Group Stage: Nacional and Peñarol
Preliminary Round: Defensor Sporting
Copa Sudamericana:
Second Stage: Nacional and Cerro Largo
First Stage: Liverpool and Danubio
Relegated: Rampla Juniors, Cerrito and Rentistas

Segunda División Uruguay

Segunda División champion: Central Español (3rd title)
Play-off winner: Progreso
Promoted: Central Español, Juventud and Progreso
Top scorer: Ramón Valencio (18 goals)

Uruguayan Segunda División Amateur

Segunda División Amateur champion: Torque (1st title)
Promoted: Torque
Desafiliated: Parque del Plata

Clubs in international competitions

Bella Vista
2011 Copa Sudamericana

Bella Vista eliminated on points 1–4.

Defensor Sporting
2012 Copa Libertadores

Defensor Sporting eliminated by finishing in 3rd place in their group.

Fénix
2011 Copa Sudamericana

Fénix eliminated on points 1–4.

Nacional
2011 Copa Sudamericana

Nacional eliminated on points 0–6.

2012 Copa Libertadores

Nacional eliminated by finishing in 3rd place in their group.

Peñarol
2012 Copa Libertadores

Peñarol eliminated by finishing in 4th place in their group.

National teams

Senior team
This section covers Uruguay's senior team matches from the end of the 2011 Copa América until the end of the 2012 Summer Olympics.

Friendly matches

World Cup qualifiers

Olympic team

Friendly matches

Summer Olympic Games

Pan American team

Friendly matches

Pan American Games

Uruguay U-20

World Cup

Friendly matches

Copa Provincia del Chaco

Uruguay U-17

Friendly matches

Uruguay U-15

Friendly matches

South American Championship

References

External links
AUF
Uruguay on FIFA.com

 
Seasons in Uruguayan football